Dimocarpus is a genus of about 20 species of trees or shrubs known to science, constituting part of the flowering plant family Sapindaceae. They grow naturally in tropical south and Southeast Asia, Malesia, Papuasia and  Australasia, including Sri Lanka, India, the Philippines, southern China, Taiwan, Burma, Cambodia, Vietnam, Malaysia, Indonesia, New Guinea, East Timor, far north-eastern Queensland Australia.

The fruit is edible, with the longan (D. longan) being grown commercially for fruit production.

The species are large evergreen trees growing to 25–40 m tall, with pinnate leaves. The flowers are individually inconspicuous, produced in large panicles. The fruit is an oval drupe 3–5 cm long containing a single seed surrounded by a translucent crisp, juicy layer of fruit pulp and a thin but hard orange or red skin.

Species

References

Further reading
 

 
Sapindaceae genera